Maxillaria notylioglossa, the Notylia-like Lip Maxillaria, is a species of orchid native to tropical South America.

Synonyms 
Maxillaria cerifera Barb.Rodr.
Maxillaria flavoviridis Barb.Rodr.
Maxillaria meirax Rchb.f. & Warm.
Ornithidium ceriferum (Barb.Rodr.) Barb.Rodr.
Ornithidium divaricatum Barb.Rodr.
Ornithidium flavoviridium (Barb.Rodr.) Barb.Rodr.
Maxillaria nervosa Rolfe ex Britton
Maxillaria divaricata (Barb.Rodr.) Cogn.
Maxillaria divaricata var. parvifolia Cogn.
Maxillaria fallax Schltr.
Rhetinantha cerifera (Barb.Rodr.) M.A.Blanco
Rhetinantha divaricata (Barb.Rodr.) M.A.Blanco
Rhetinantha notylioglossa (Rchb.f.) M.A.Blanco

References

External links 

notylioglossa
Orchids of South America